Olivia Alexandra Linnéa Ulenius (born 2007) is a Finnish footballer, who represents Åland United in the Kansallinen Liiga. She is one of the youngest players on the team.

Ulenius made her debut in the adult leagues at the age of 13 in the 2020 season of Naisten Kolmonen in IFK Mariehamn's team. She played her first match in the Kansallinen Liiga in the summer of 2021 and in the same autumn signed a contract with Åland United until 2024. In the spring of 2022, Ulenius' contract was extended until 2025. Ulenius scored her first league goal in May 2022 against FC Ilves. She was awarded as the best player of the Finnish Women's Cup final in 2022.

Ulenius played her first international match in April 2022, when the Finnish U15 women's national team faced Estonia.

References

External links
 Player's profile at Football Association of Finland 

2007 births
Living people
Finnish women's footballers
Kansallinen Liiga players
Women's association football forwards
People from Mariehamn
Sportspeople from Southwest Finland